Reed Malone (born April 3, 1995) is a former American competition swimmer who competes in the freestyle events. He has won a total of four medals in a major international competition, two golds, one silver, and one bronze, spanning the World Championships and the Summer Universiade.

Malone had an impressive collegiate career at University of Southern California as a 7-time All-American, 2-time NCAA Champion, and 5-time Pac-12 Champion. He remains among USC's all-time top 10 in the 100y, 200y, and 500y free-style. Known for his leadership out of the pool, Malone was USC's first ever three-time captain and honored as Trojan of the Year in 2017.

Malone first established himself into the world swimming scene at the 2015 Summer Universiade in Gwangju, South Korea, where he produced a tally of three medals, two golds and one bronze. On the third night of the competition, Malone swam his two finals with only an hour in between. First, he lowered his personal best in 1:47.15 to lead the medal haul for the Americans with a gold in the 200 m freestyle. Fresh off his illustrious triumph in the 200 m freestyle, Malone came back later in the session to complete an epic double with a bronze-winning time of 3:50.13 in the 400 m freestyle. Malone followed his double feat by claiming a gold medal with the U.S. team in the 4×200 m freestyle relay three days later. Swimming the second leg, Malone recorded a fastest split of the race in 1:47.06 to pull off a commanding lead for the Americans with a final time of 7:10.82.

At the 2015 World Aquatics Championships in Kazan, Russia, Malone achieved a silver medal as a newcomer to the U.S. swimming team in the 4×200 m freestyle relay. He swam a 1:46.92 split on the third leg to maintain a strong, body-length lead for the Americans throughout the race, before losing their defense to the Brits by just four tenths of a second (0.4), finishing with a final time of 7:04.75.

At the 2016 Olympic Trials, Malone finished 10th in the 400 free (3:50.73) and 15th in the 200 free (1:48.85). Malone graduated from USC in 2018 and moved to New York City to work at the Late Show with Stephen Colbert for a brief retirement before returning to the pool late 2018. He began training again with Wildcat Aquatics at Northwestern University and made his professional debut at the Tyr Pro Swim Series in Des Moines, placing 4th overall in the 400m freestyle (3:53.8) and 10th in the 200m (1:50.44), qualifying for the 2020 Olympic Trials in both events.

In fall 2019, Malone began training with Team Elite Aquatics in San Diego, California in preparation for the 2020 Olympics.

Malone is now in technology sales as a Business Development Representative for the fast-growing software company Lattice.

References

External links
 
 
 Reed Malone – University of Southern California athlete profile at USCTrojans.com

1995 births
Living people
American male freestyle swimmers
World Aquatics Championships medalists in swimming
USC Trojans men's swimmers
Universiade medalists in swimming
People from Winnetka, Illinois
Sportspeople from Illinois
Universiade gold medalists for the United States
Universiade bronze medalists for the United States
Medalists at the 2015 Summer Universiade